Right Field can refer to:

 Right field, an outfield position in baseball or softball
 "Right Field", a song on Peter, Paul & Mary's 1986 album No Easy Walk to Freedom